Edith Mary Skom (née Rosen; August 8, 1929 – February 3, 2016) was the author of three detective novels with a nineteenth-century literature theme, published between 1989 and 1998. The books feature amateur sleuth Professor Beth Austen, and take place at the fictional "Midwestern University."

Edith Skom was a Distinguished Senior Lecturer Emeritus in The Writing Program at Northwestern University.

Books

 The Mark Twain Murders, 1989 (nominated for an Agatha, an Anthony and a Macavity Award)
 The George Eliot Murders, 1995
 The Charles Dickens Murders, 1998

References

1929 births
2016 deaths
20th-century American novelists
American mystery writers
American women novelists
Women mystery writers
20th-century American women writers
21st-century American women